Events from the year 1879 in Scotland.

Incumbents

Law officers 
 Lord Advocate – William Watson
 Solicitor General for Scotland – John Macdonald

Judiciary 
 Lord President of the Court of Session and Lord Justice General – Lord Glencorse
 Lord Justice Clerk – Lord Moncreiff

Events 

 4 January – Dundee-born Mormon missionary Hugh Findlay arrives in Shetland from the United States and on 31 March baptizes the islands' first two converts.
 25 January – first service held in St Mary's Cathedral, Edinburgh (Episcopal) on completion of the nave.
 1 April – Dundee Stock Exchange established.
 6 June – William Denny and Brothers launch the world's first ocean-going steamer to be built of mild steel, the SS Rotomahana, at Dumbarton.
 31 July – the Caledonian Railway opens the original Glasgow Central station.
 30 September – foundation stone of the Forth Bridge is laid on Inchgarvie.
 2 October – William Denny and Brothers launch the world's first transatlantic steamer to be built of mild steel, the SS Buenos Ayrean, at Dumbarton. On 1 December she makes her maiden voyage out of Glasgow for South America.
 28 December – the Tay Bridge disaster: the central part of the new Tay Bridge at Dundee collapses in a storm as a train passes over it, killing 78.
 Construction of Garnethill Synagogue, Glasgow, the oldest to survive in Scotland, begins.
 Royal Infirmary of Edinburgh moves to Lauriston Place.
 First Angus cattle society formed.

Births 
 13 January – William Reid Dick, sculptor (died 1961 in England)
 16 January – Jimmy Gillespie, rugby union player (died 1943)
 27 March – Catherine Carswell, née Catherine Roxburgh Macfarlane, author (died 1946 in England)
 29 March – Evelyn Vida Baxter, ornithologist (died 1959)
 24 August – John Maclean, Marxist (died 1923)
 13 September – Tommy Tait, international footballer (died 1942)
 21 October – Willie Anderson, golfer (died 1910 in the United States)
 23 October – John MacDougall Hay, Church of Scotland minister and novelist (died 1919)
 John Maxwell, film producer (died 1940 in England)
 Henry J. Watt, experimental psychologist (died 1925)

Deaths 
 19 June – James Valentine, photographer (born 1815)
 23 July – Charles Baillie, Lord Jerviswoode, advocate, judge and politician (born 1804)
 29 October – John Blackwood, publisher (born 1818)
 5 November – James Clerk Maxwell, theoretical physicist (born 1831; died of abdominal cancer in Cambridge)
 23 November – Mark Napier, lawyer, sheriff, biographer and historical author (born 1798)

The arts
 6 September – first publication of a story by Arthur Conan Doyle, "The Mystery of Sasassa Valley" in Chambers's Journal.
 Construction of Royalty Theatre, Glasgow, completed.

See also 
 Timeline of Scottish history
 1879 in the United Kingdom

References 

 
Years of the 19th century in Scotland
Scotland
1870s in Scotland